The following lists events that happened in 1971 in Iceland.

Incumbents
President – Kristján Eldjárn
Prime Minister – Jóhann Hafstein, Ólafur Jóhannesson

Events

Births

20 June – Thor Kristinsson, singer-songwriter
15 September – Ragnar Bragason, film director, screenwriter and producer.

Full date missing
Valgeir Sigurðsson, record producer and musician

Deaths

References

 
1970s in Iceland
Iceland
Iceland
Years of the 20th century in Iceland